Qakare Ini (also Intef) was an ancient Egyptian or Nubian ruler who most likely reigned at the end of the 11th and beginning of the 12th Dynasty over Lower Nubia. Although he is the best attested Nubian ruler of this time period, nothing is known of his activities.

Attestations
Qakare Ini is the best attested of a series of coeval Nubian rulers including Segerseni and Iyibkhentre. Indeed, his full pharaonic royal titulary is known thanks to 16 rock inscriptions found in Umbarakab, Mudenejar, Guthnis, Taifa, Abu Simbel and Toshka, all in Lower Nubia. These inscriptions record Qakare Ini's titulary, sometimes only a cartouche, and never give any more details. In the case of the inscription from Toshka, Qakare Ini's name is inscribed next to that of Iyibkhentre. However, the Egyptologist Darrell Baker proposed that this was due to the lack of space on the rock rather than pointing to a connection between the two rulers. Thus, the relationships between Qakare Ini and the other two Nubian rulers of the period, Segerseni and Iyibkhentre, remain unknown.

Qakare Ini  is not attested on any Egyptian king list.

Name
Qakare's personal name is Ini although in literature he is sometimes reported as Intef or Initef; curiously, the epithet son of Ra is placed inside the cartouche, thus rendering his name Sa-Ra-Ini.

Datation
Qakare Ini could have been a pretender to the Egyptian throne headquartered in Lower Nubia, during the politically troubled period spanning the reign of Mentuhotep IV of the 11th Dynasty and the early reign of Amenemhat I of the 12th Dynasty. In fact, both those rulers seem to have had problems in being universally recognized as legitimate pharaohs. As Nubia had gained its independence from Egypt during the First Intermediate Period, it is possible that Qakare Ini was one of the last Nubian chieftains to resist the return of the Egyptians at the beginning of the 12th Dynasty.

Hungarian Egyptologist László Török suggested a much more recent dating for Qakare Ini (as well as for the other two related rulers mentioned above), some time after the reign of pharaoh Neferhotep I of the 13th Dynasty, that during the Second Intermediate Period, between 1730 and 1650 BCE. This is rejected by Darrell Baker and the Czech archeologist Zbyněk Žába who believe that Qakare Ini lived concurrently with the end of the 11th Dynasty in the late 20th century BCE.

References

Henri Gauthier, "Nouvelles remarques sur la XIe dynastie", BIFAO 9 (1911), pp. 99–136.
Thomas Schneider, Lexikon der Pharaonen. Albatros, Düsseldorf 2002, p. 74.
Arthur Weigall, A Report on the Antiquities of Lower Nubia. Cairo 1907, pls. 64-65.

20th-century BC Pharaohs
People of the Eleventh Dynasty of Egypt
People of the Twelfth Dynasty of Egypt
Non-dynastic pharaohs
20th-century BC rulers
History of Nubia